The Star of Greece was a three-masted clipper that was built in 1868 by Harland and Wolff in Belfast for JP Corry & Co. 

The ship initially sailed the profitable route between Calcutta, India and Britain, carrying coal to India and commodities such as jute in the opposite direction. On one occasion, the Star of Greece suffered a fire in its cargo of coal. The ship's design featured three separate holds isolated by steel bulkheads, and the crew were able to contain the fire by pumping water into the hold. The ship safely made its way to Calcutta.

In the 1870s, the profitability of clipper trade with India declined due to competition from steam ships sailing through newly opened Suez Canal and the Mediterranean Ocean instead of rounding Cape Horn and the Cape of Good Hope. Thus, the Star of Greece's owners decided to serve the still profitable route to Australia. On this route, the Star of Greece would transport miscellaneous supplies to Australia and commodities such as wool and wheat back to Britain.

On July 13, 1888, the Star of Greece sank off Port Willunga in South Australia with the loss of 18 crew. Two inquiries blamed the Captain, Henry Russel Harrower, for the sinking.

Today, the Star of Greece has become a popular dive site for recreational divers. The ship's remains are easily accessible, lying in relatively shallow water close to shore.

References
Simpson, P. W. The Star of Greece: for Profit and Glory, Clipper Ship Press, Adelaide, South Australia 2020

Tea clippers
Barques
Individual sailing vessels
Victorian-era merchant ships of the United Kingdom
1868 ships